Nitrostarch is the common name of a secondary explosive similar to nitrocellulose. Much like starch, it is made up of two components, nitrated amylose and nitrated amylopectin. Nitrated amylopectin generally has a greater solubility than amylose; however, it is less stable than nitrated amylose. 

The solubility, detonation velocity, and impact sensitivity depends heavily on the level of nitration.

Synthesis 
Nitrostarch is made by dissolving starch in red fuming nitric acid. It is then precipitated by adding the solution to concentrated sulfuric acid.

C6H12O6 + 4NHO3  <=> 4C6H6N4O13 + 4H2O

Nitrostarch can be stabilized by refluxing it in ethanol to drive off the left over nitric acid.

History
Nitrostarch was first discovered by French chemist and pharmacist Henri Braconnot.

In World War I, it was used as a filler in hand grenades.

References 

Explosive chemicals